Kalgansky District is an administrative and municipal district (raion), one of the thirty-one in Zabaykalsky Krai, Russia. It is located in the southeast of the krai and borders Nerchinsko-Zavodsky District in the north, Priargunsky District in the south, and Alexandrovo-Zavodsky District in the west. Its administrative center is the rural locality (a selo) of Kalga. As of the 2010 Census, the total population of the district was 8,771, with the population of Kalga accounting for 39.1% of that number.

History
The district was established on December 8, 1942.

References

Notes

Sources

Districts of Zabaykalsky Krai
States and territories established in 1942
